Saraphi is a district (amphoe) of Chiang Mai province, northern Thailand.

Etymology
Saraphi is the Thai name for a tree, Mammea siamensis.

Geography
Saraphi borders the districts (from west clockwise) Hang Dong, Mueang Chiang Mai, San Kamphaeng of Chiang Mai Province, Mueang Lamphun of Lamphun province.

History
The district was established in 1891, then named Yang Noeng (ยางเนิ้ง). In 1927 it was renamed Saraphi.

Administration
The district is divided into 12 sub-districts (tambons), which are further subdivided into 105 villages (mubans). Yang Noeng is a township (thesaban tambon) which covers parts of tambons Yang Noeng, Saraphi, and Nong Phueng. The township Saraphi covers parts of tambon Saraphi. There are a further 10 tambon administrative organizations (TAO).

See also
 Chiang Mai Metropolitan Area

References

External links
amphoe.com

Saraphi